Lorenco Metaj (born 16 September 1994 in Fier) is an Albanian professional footballer who plays for Oriku in the Albanian First Division.

References

1994 births
Living people
Footballers from Vlorë
Albanian footballers
Association football defenders
Flamurtari Vlorë players
KF Himara players
KF Bylis Ballsh players
KF Oriku players
Kategoria Superiore players
Kategoria e Parë players